"How I Miss You Baby" is a song written by Bobby Womack and Darryl Carter. Womack released it as a single in 1969 and was included on his 1970 album My Prescription. The song's lyrics detail Womack's misery because his true love left him "a week ago." "How I Miss You Baby" returned Womack to the top 20 of Billboard's R&B chart at #14 and also became a minor success on the Billboard Hot 100 (#93).

Bobby Womack songs
1969 singles
Songs written by Bobby Womack
1969 songs
Minit Records singles